Anne-Hilarion de Costentin, Comte de Tourville (24 November 1642, Paris – 23 May 1701) was a French naval commander who served under King Louis XIV. He was made Marshal of France in 1693. Tourville is widely considered as one of the most celebrated admirals in French naval history and is usually counted as one of the greatest naval technicians of his time.

Military career
At age 17, as a Knight of Malta, he fought his first naval battle on a frigate of the Order of Malta.

At 25, he joined the French Royal Navy and began an active career, fighting the 1673 campaign of the Franco-Dutch War on the Sans-Pareil, at the Battle of Agosta where he was in command of the Syrene, and later in command of the Sceptre.

He served under Abraham Duquesne during the campaigns of 1676, and became a commander in 1690 during the War of the Grand Alliance. He flew his personal flag on the Soleil Royal, where it would stay until the battle of La Hougue in 1692. At the Battle of Beachy Head (Victoire de Béveziers), 1690, he defeated an Anglo-Dutch fleet, sinking or capturing seven enemy ships.

On 29 May 1692, at the opening battle of the Battles of Barfleur and La Hogue, with only 45 ships, he held at bay an English and Dutch fleet of 97 ships, but was forced to retreat. His fleet suffered heavy losses after the battle when English and Dutch fire ships attacked the French ships of the line which were immobilized for repairs in port at Cherbourg-en-Cotentin.

On 27 June 1693, he defeated a convoy of 59 English merchantmen commanded by George Rooke  at Cape St. Vincent near Lagos Bay in Portugal, during the Battle of Cape St. Vincent.

Honours and tributes

Tourville retired after the 1697 Peace of Ryswick and died in Paris on 23 May 1701, regarded as a national hero.

A number of French naval vessels from the 18th through 20th centuries were named in Tourville's honour.
An 1816 marble statue of Admiral Tourville, by French sculptor Joseph Charles Marin, formerly in the Jardin de Versailles, features prominently in the Village of Tourville-sur-Seine (Normandy, Manche Département) hometown of Tourville ancestors, though Anne-Hilarion de Tourville himself was born in Paris and not in the ancestral castle of Tourville-sur-Sienne.

References

Attribution:

External links

 Encyclopedia.com information about Anne-Hilarion de Tourville

1642 births
1701 deaths
French military personnel of the Franco-Dutch War
French military personnel of the Nine Years' War
French Navy admirals
Knights of Malta
Marshals of France
Military personnel from Paris